Belivah is a suburb in the City of Logan, Queensland, Australia.

Geography 
The Beaudesert–Beenleigh Road runs along most of the eastern boundary.

History 
In December 1872 a Congregational Church opened on Mr McLean's land.

Belivah Provisional School opened circa 1874 and classes were held in a church. In September 1891, the residents were agitating to relocate the school to a location closer to where more children lived, but Queensland Government did not wish to pay for a new provisional school. In March 1892 the residents commenced the construction of a new school themselves and the Queensland Government agreed to contribute £37 to complete the building. It was renamed Wolffdene Provisional School. On 1 January 1909, it became Wolffdene State School. It closed in 1935 but re-opened on 15 February 1939. It closed permanently on 31 August 1942.

The median age of the Belivah population was 43 years, 6 years above the national median of 37. 67.6% of people living in Belivah were born in Australia. The other top responses for country of birth were England 9.6%, New Zealand 3.7%, Germany 2.5%, Scotland 1.9%, Zimbabwe 1.9%. 86.7% of people spoke only English at home; the next most common languages were 2.8% Mandarin, 1.2% Finnish, 1.2% Persian (excluding Dari), 0.9% Polish, 0.9% Italian.

References

External links 

 

Suburbs of Logan City